John B. Augsburger (born 1940) is an American former politician from the state of Indiana. A Republican, he served in the Indiana State Senate.

References

Living people
1940 births
Indiana state senators